Cardinal Stadium, formerly known as Papa John's Cardinal Stadium, is a football stadium in Louisville, Kentucky, the current stadium of the Louisville Cardinals football team.

Cardinal Stadium may also refer to:

Benedetti–Wehrli Stadium in Naperville, Illinois, which opened as Cardinal Stadium.
Cardinals Field, a softball venue at University of the Incarnate Word in San Antonio, Texas.
Cardinal Stadium (Washington, D.C.) at the Catholic University of America, Washington, D.C.
Cardinal Stadium (1956), formerly known as Fairgrounds Stadium, a multipurpose stadium in Louisville, Kentucky and former home of the Louisville Cardinals football and baseball teams.
Provost Umphrey Stadium, the stadium of Lamar University's football stadium located in Beaumont, Texas which opened as Cardinal Stadium.
State Farm Stadium in Glendale, Arizona, the home of the NFL's Arizona Cardinals, which opened as Cardinals Stadium.